Butte Airport may refer to:
Bert Mooney Airport (IATA: BTM, ICAO: KBTM, FAA LID: BTM), serving Butte, Montana
Butte Municipal Airport (FAA LID: AK1), serving Butte, Alaska